S. Jithesh, popularly known as Jitheshji, is a speed cartoonist and former Vice-Chairman of Kerala Cartoon Academy. He has initiated and popularised "Super-Speedy Cartooning" through his infotainment cartoon stage shows named Varayarangu. His infotainment art form, Varayarangu, is a blend of poetry, anecdotes, and socio-political satire with high speed drawing. Sketching of more than thousand celebrity caricatures at a quick pace and satirical commentary is the major attraction of his cartoon stage shows. He is recognised as the "World's Fastest Performing Cartoonist" since his ability to speed sketch fifty celebrity caricatures within five minutes.

He has conducted more than 7000 speed cartoon stage shows across India and abroad. As a Performing Cartoonist he is known for his lightning sketches and pictorial speech on stage. He was the editor-in-chief of Chiricheppu Cartoon monthly. Jithesh's interests are not limited to cartooning alone since he has also published his own collections of poems in Malayalam.

Personal life
He was born on 30 December 1974 at Pandalam in Pathanamthitta District as the son of K. N. Somasekharan Nair and M. Remani Amma  He graduated with a LL.B degree and an M.A in English Literature. He is married to Unnimaya and father of two children.

Published works
Nakshathrangale Pranayicha Oraal (Library of Congress citation: Jitēṣ, Es. Nakṣatr̲aṅṅaḷe pr̲aṇayicca orāḷ : kavitakaḷ / Es. Jitēṣ. Nūr̲anāṭ : Uṇma Pabḷikkēṣans, 1999. 50 p. : ill. ; 22 cm. LC Control Number 99952122)
Kuttikkavitthakalum Cartoon Padanavum 
Cartoon-Caricature Varakkaan Padikkan

References

Other sources
Kerala Sahitya Akademi’s ‘Sahityakara Directory’.
Samakalika Malayalam Weekly’s 2004 October 1- Issue, Page74 (Jeevitham Enne Enthu Padippichu column compiled by T.N.Jayachandran I.A.S
Kavikalum Kavitha Charithravum- An Academic Encyclopedia, Published by Haritham Books, Kozhikode.

External links
Hindu.com
Hindu.com
Yentha.com 
The New Indian Express
Hindu.com
Hindu.com
Hindu.com
Newindianexpress.com
Kairali TV Interview

Living people
People from Pandalam
Indian caricaturists
1974 births
Indian cartoonists
Malayali people
Indian performance artists
Writers from Kerala